Sergio Andres Camargo Peñaranda (born August 16, 1994) is a Canadian professional soccer player who plays as a midfielder for Cavalry FC in the Canadian Premier League.

Club career

Toronto FC
In 2009, Camargo went on trial with Vitória de Guimarães in Portugal and was offered a contract, however, because of a FIFA regulation that would have required his parents to move to Portugal in order to be allowed to play for the club, he was unable to join the team. Instead, he returned to Canada and joined Toronto FC.

Camargo began his career in 2009 with TFC Academy II in the Second Division of the Canadian Soccer League, later moving up to the team in the First Division. In 2010, he was named the divisions MVP and Rookie of the Year. From 2013 to 2016 he played college soccer with Coastal Carolina Chanticleers, and Syracuse Orange. During his stint in college his achievements were being named to the 2015 All-Big South Second Team and the 2013 Big South All-Freshman team. In 2015, he played with K-W United in the USL Premier Development League, where he captained the team to the PDL Championship. In 2017, Toronto FC of the Major League Soccer signed him to a HGP contract. He was loaned to Toronto FC II in the United Soccer League, and made his debut on April 1, 2017 against the Tampa Bay Rowdies. Following the 2017 season, Camargo's option was not picked up, ending his contract with the club.

Calgary Foothills
In 2018, he was originally set to join his former youth club Unionville-Milliken in League1 Ontario, but later was able to join Calgary Foothills FC in the USL PDL. He scored four goals in ten regular season appearances and made three playoff appearances, helping Calgary win its first PDL Championship.

Cavalry FC

Camargo joined Cavalry FC of the Canadian Premier League in November 2018. He made his CPL debut on 4 May 2019 in a 2–1 win over York9. He scored his first two goals for Cavalry on 15 June 2019 in a 3–0 win over FC Edmonton. Camargo scored a goal against Montreal Impact in the Canadian Championship semi-final on 7 August 2019 in a 2–1 loss. In total, he scored six goals in eighteen league appearances that season. On 13 November 2019, Camargo re-signed with Cavalry for the 2020 season. In November 2020, Camargo would re-sign with the club for the 2021 season, his third season with the club. In January 2022, it was announced Camargo would return for the 2022 season, his fourth with the club. In January 2023, Cavalry announced they had re-signed Camargo to a contract extension through the 2024 season.

International career
Camargo is eligible to play internationally for Colombia by birth and for Canada by naturalization.

On June 22, 2011, Camargo made his debut for the Canada men's national under-17 soccer team in the 2011 FIFA U-17 World Cup.

Personal life
Camargo was born in Cúcuta to Colombian parents. At age four he and his parents moved to Toronto, and then to Newmarket, Ontario when he was nine.

Career statistics

Honours

Club
K-W United FC
PDL Championship: 2015

Calgary Foothills
PDL Championship: 2018

Calvary FC 
 Canadian Premier League Finals 
Runners-up: 2019
Canadian Premier League (Regular season): 
Champions: Spring 2019, Fall 2019

References

External links

1994 births
Living people
Association football midfielders
Canadian soccer players
Colombian footballers
People from Cúcuta
Sportspeople from Newmarket, Ontario
Soccer players from Toronto
Colombian emigrants to Canada
Naturalized citizens of Canada
Canadian people of Colombian descent
Canadian expatriate soccer players
Colombian expatriate footballers
Expatriate soccer players in the United States
Canadian expatriate sportspeople in the United States
Colombian expatriate sportspeople in the United States
Coastal Carolina Chanticleers men's soccer players
Syracuse Orange men's soccer players
K-W United FC players
Toronto FC players
Toronto FC II players
Calgary Foothills FC players
Cavalry FC players
Canadian Soccer League (1998–present) players
USL League Two players
Major League Soccer players
USL Championship players
Canadian Premier League players
Canada men's youth international soccer players
Homegrown Players (MLS)
Unionville Milliken SC players